Thomas Michael Durkin (born December 26, 1953) is a United States district judge of the United States District Court for the Northern District of Illinois.

Biography
Durkin was born in Chicago, Illinois. He received his Bachelor of Science degree, cum laude, from the University of Illinois at Urbana-Champaign in 1975. He received his Juris Doctor degree, cum laude, from the DePaul University College of Law in 1978. From 1978 to 1980, he served as a law clerk to Judge Stanley J. Roszkowski of the United States District Court for the Northern District of Illinois.  From 1980 to 1993, he served as an Assistant United States Attorney in the Northern District of Illinois. His leadership positions during that service included Chief of the Special Prosecutions Division, Chief of the Criminal Receiving and Appellate Division and First Assistant United States Attorney. From 1993 to 2012, he served as a partner at Mayer Brown LLP, where he handled a wide variety of matters including complex commercial litigation and white collar criminal defense.

Federal judicial service
On May 21, 2012, President Barack Obama nominated Durkin to be a United States District Judge for the United States District Court for the Northern District of Illinois, to the seat vacated by Judge Wayne Andersen who retired in 2010. The Senate confirmed Durkin in a voice vote on December 17, 2012. He received his commission on December 19, 2012.

Dennis Hastert case
In 2015, Durkin heard allegations against former Speaker of the House Dennis Hastert, who was charged with alleged violations of banking laws, reportedly to pay off a victim of sexual abuse.  Durkin declared several potential conflicts of interest, including a past donation to Hastert's congressional campaign and past interactions with prosecutors in the case; ultimately, the attorneys did not seek his recusal. Ultimately, Durkin sentenced Hastert to 15 months in prison, far more than the federal recommended sentencing guidelines of zero to six months of prison. The maximum possible sentence was five years. Durkin also described Hastert as a "serial child molester".

Personal
Durkin's brother, Jim Durkin, is a Republican member of the Illinois House of Representatives.

References

External links

1953 births
Living people
Assistant United States Attorneys
DePaul University College of Law alumni
Illinois lawyers
Judges of the United States District Court for the Northern District of Illinois
Lawyers from Chicago
United States district court judges appointed by Barack Obama
21st-century American judges
University of Illinois Urbana-Champaign alumni
People associated with Mayer Brown